Metzgeria problematica is a species of sea snail, a marine gastropod mollusk in the family Ptychatractidae.

References

Ptychatractidae
Gastropods described in 1968